Liolaemus pacha is a species of lizard in the family Iguanidae.  It is endemic to Argentina.

References

pacha
Lizards of South America
Reptiles of Argentina
Endemic fauna of Argentina
Reptiles described in 2013
Taxa named by Viviana Isabel Juárez Heredia